András Aradszki (born 22 May 1956) is a Hungarian politician and member of the National Assembly for Érd (MP) since 2010. He was appointed Secretary of State for Energy in the Ministry of National Development in 2014. As a Member of Parliament, he worked in the Committee for Economic and Information Technology and Committee on Sustainable Development. He was also a member of the Public Procurement Council from 2006 to 2010.

Personal life
He is married. His wife is Dr Éva Aradszkiné Kapeller. They have two daughters, Nóra and Dea.

Coquetry with racism 
On 20 February 2020, muddling the ethnicity with the social circumstances, he published the following faux-naïf post to his Hungarian Facebook account (translated): "I don't understand...if 80% of the prisoners is romani, the judge is racist?"

References

External links
 Országgyűlés biography 
 Aradszki András webpage 

1956 births
Living people
Christian Democratic People's Party (Hungary) politicians
Members of the National Assembly of Hungary (2010–2014)
Members of the National Assembly of Hungary (2014–2018)
Members of the National Assembly of Hungary (2018–2022)
Members of the National Assembly of Hungary (2022–2026)
People from Békéscsaba